Elections were held in the state of Western Australia on 20 November 1943 to elect all 50 members to the Legislative Assembly. The Labor Party, led by Premier John Willcock, won a fourth term in office against the Country and Nationalist parties, led by Opposition Leader Arthur Watts and Robert Ross McDonald respectively.

The election took place in the midst of World War II, and as such, turnout was considerably down on the previous election. The election was delayed from its intended date of February 1942 by the Legislative Assembly Duration and General Election Postponement Acts (No 51 of 1941, assented 16 January 1942, and No 18 of 1942, assented 9 December 1942) due to the war.

In the previous term, two changes of membership occurred at by-elections. George Lambert, the Labor member for Yilgarn-Coolgardie, died on 30 June 1941 and was replaced by former Labor branch secretary Lionel Kelly, running under the "Independent Country" banner. He ultimately joined the Labor Party and became a minister in the Bert Hawke government in the 1950s. In 1943, long-serving and colourful independent Thomas Hughes resigned his seat of East Perth to contest the federal seat of Perth. It was picked up by Labor's Herb Graham. Prior to the election, former Independent Nationalist Arthur Abbott joined the Nationalist Party.

Results

Apart from Labor gaining two seats from the Country Party (Avon and Greenough) and one from the Nationalists (Nelson, where Ernest Hoar defeated the incumbent member by just 17 votes), no changes took place at the election. An interesting race in Mount Marshall opened up by the retirement of incumbent Country member Frederick Warner ended with the Country candidate, Hugh Leslie, victorious against the ALP and former minister John Lindsay.

|}

 274,856 electors were enrolled to vote at the election, but 12 of the 50 seats were uncontested—11 Labor seats (seven more than 1939, including all of the Fremantle seats) representing 57,651 enrolled voters, and one Nationalist seat representing 4,829 voters. The estimated swing from 1939 and 1943 was approximately 4% to Labor.

To date this is the only time in which a Labor Premier in Willcock has won back to back elections.

See also
 Members of the Western Australian Legislative Assembly, 1939–1943
 Members of the Western Australian Legislative Assembly, 1943–1947
 Willcock Ministry

References

Elections in Western Australia
1943 elections in Australia
1940s in Western Australia
November 1943 events